Live & Indestructible is an extended play (EP) by American heavy metal band Disturbed. It was released on September 30, 2008 exclusively through iTunes Store and on October 7, 2008 via other online retailers. It features three live tracks from Disturbed's first online concert at Deep Rock Drive and includes the music video for Indestructible's third official single and title track, "Indestructible". The EP was also sold at Hot Topic stores exclusively in CD format, featuring an alternative cover. This version features an extra song, "Stupify", and lacks the music video for "Indestructible".

Track listing 
All tracks written and performed by David Draiman, Dan Donegan, Mike Wengren and John Moyer, credited as Disturbed.

Digital

CD

Personnel 
David Draiman – lead vocals
Dan Donegan – guitar
Mike Wengren – drums
John Moyer – bass, backing vocals
CJ De Villar – mixing

References 

Disturbed (band) albums
2008 EPs
2008 live albums
Live EPs
Reprise Records live albums
Reprise Records EPs